Fault Bluff is a notable rock bluff,  high, situated  northeast of Mount Longhurst in the Cook Mountains of Antarctica. The feature was visited in the 1957–58 season by members of the Darwin Glacier Party of the Commonwealth Trans-Antarctic Expedition, 1956–58. They applied the name which presumably refers to a geological fault at the bluff.

See also 
Mount Gudmundson, standing 6 nautical miles (11 km) northeast of Fault Bluff

References

External links

Cliffs of Oates Land